Major General Robert Maxwell Johnstone  (9 March 1914 – 11 March 1990) was a senior British Army officer.

Early life
Johnstone was born in Edinburgh and educated at the Edinburgh Academy, Craigflower Preparatory School, Fettes College, Christ's College, Cambridge and the University of Edinburgh.  He graduated M.A. M.B. B.Chir. from Cambridge and M.B. Ch.B. from Edinburgh in 1938. From 1938-1939 he was employed as a resident house physician and surgeon at the Royal Infirmary, Edinburgh.  He attained MRCPED in 1940, FRCPED in 1944 and MD in 1954.

Army
Throughout World War II he served with the Royal Army Medical Corps.  Between 1938-1941 he served with 129 Field Regiment and became company commander of the 167 Field Regiment from 1941-1943.  In 1943 he was based at the Staff College, Haifa.  Johnstone was awarded the Military Cross (MC) in August 1943, for his services at Enfidaville, Tunisia, in April/May 1943.  From 1945-1946 he was commanding officer of 3 Field Ambulance. 

Johnstone was medical advisor to HQ East Africa Command from 1950-1951. He served with the Commonwealth forces, Korea between 1954-1955. On 22 October 1954 he was appointed a Member of the Order of the British Empire (MBE) in recognition of distinguished services in Malaya during the period 1 January to 30 June.  

From 1955-1957 he was officer in charge of the medical division at the Cambridge Military Hospital, Aldershot Garrison, Hampshire.  Between 1957-1959 he was based at Queen Alexandra Military Hospital (QAMH), Millbank, London.  

In 1959 he became Professor of Medicine, University of Baghdad and honorary consultant physician to the Iraqi Army.  From 1963-1965 he was commanding officer of British Military Hospital (BMH), Iserlohn, Germany, and from 1965-1967 he was consultant physician to HQ, Far East Land Forces (FARELF).  Between 1967-1968 he was deputy director of medical services, Southern Command and Army Strategic Command from 1968-1969.  In June 1969 he was appointed Commander of the Order of St John (CStJ). 

Following his retirement from the Army in 1969 he served as assistant director (overseas) of the British Postgraduate Medical Federation from 1970-1976.

References

External links
Robert Maxwell Johnstone - National Portrait Gallery

1914 births
1990 deaths
People educated at Edinburgh Academy
People educated at Craigflower Preparatory School
People educated at Fettes College
Alumni of Christ's College, Cambridge
Alumni of the University of Edinburgh
Royal Army Medical Corps officers
Fellows of the Royal College of Physicians of Edinburgh
British Army personnel of World War II
Scottish generals
British Army major generals
Members of the Order of the British Empire
Recipients of the Military Cross
Commanders of the Order of St John
Military personnel from Edinburgh